Jusef Erabi (born 8 June 2003) is a Swedish footballer who plays as a forward for Hammarby IF in Allsvenskan.

Early life
Born and raised in Stockholm, Erabi played youth football with local clubs Rågsveds IF, Stuvsta IF, Älvsjö AIK, IF Stockholms Fotbollsakademi and Hammarby IF.

Club career

Hammarby IF
In 2020, Erabi was sent on loan to Hammarby's affiliated club IK Frej in Ettan, the domestic third tier, where he made his debut in senior football.

On 3 February 2021, Erabi scored in his debut for the club's senior squad, in a 3–3 friendly draw against Akropolis IF. On 23 July the same year, he made his competitive debut for Hammarby, coming on as a substitute in a 3–1 home win against Maribor in the UEFA Europa Conference League.

On 10 August 2022, Erabi signed a two and a half year-contract with Hammarby, running until the end of 2024.

International career
On 4 September 2021, Erabi made his debut for the Swedish U19's in a 0–3 loss against Finland.

Personal life
Erabi is of Afghan descent, and his father Wahid is a former player for the Afghanistan national football team.

Career statistics

Club

References

External links

2003 births
Living people
Swedish people of Afghan descent
Swedish footballers
Association football forwards
Sweden youth international footballers
IK Frej players
Hammarby Fotboll players
Hammarby Talang FF players
Allsvenskan players
Ettan Fotboll players
Footballers from Stockholm